Mohsen Mehralizadeh (born September 30, 1956) is an Iranian reformist politician and former Governor of Isfahan Province.
He was a Vice President of Iran and the head of the National Sports Organization of Iran under President Khatami. He is an ethnic Azerbaijani.

Mehralizadeh was the governor of the Khorasan in Khatami's first term of presidency.

Presidential candidacy

2005 Iranian Presidential Election
During the campaign for 2005 presidential election, Mehralizadeh announced his ambition for presidency on December 29 and said he was the candidate for the younger generation. He  received some support from Majlis representatives of Guilan, Azerbaijan and Khorasan. On May 22, 2005, the Guardian Council rejected Mehralizadeh and Mostafa Moeen's candidacy, but the next day they approved both reformist candidates after the controversial letter of Ayatollah Khamenei, the Supreme Leader of Iran, who specifically asked for their approval.

Mehralizadeh ranked last in the seven candidates running on June 17, 2005, securing about 1,300,000 votes (4.40%), a record number and percentage for  a last finishing presidential candidate in Iran. He ranked first in the two provinces of the Iranian Azerbaijan.

2021 Iranian Presidential Election
Mohsen Mehralizadeh registered as a presidential candidate for 2021 presidential election in May 2021, and then subsequently was approved by Guardian Council. He was the only Reformist candidate among all other 6 candidates. He did withdraw from the competition two days before final election date.

References

External links

Candidates for President of Iran
People from Maragheh
1956 births
Living people
University of Tabriz alumni
Governors of Razavi Khorasan Province
Iranian reformists
Heads of Physical Education Organization